Hamperokken is a mountain in Tromsø Municipality in Troms og Finnmark county, Norway.

References

Mountains of Troms og Finnmark
Tromsø